Siwan Sub-division is a subdivision out of two subdivisions of Siwan district (One out of 101 Subdivisions of Bihar). It comprises 13 Blocks of Siwan.

Blocks of Siwan Subdivision

References

Subdivisions of Bihar